Thomas Synofzik (born 30 December 1966) is a German musicologist. He is director of the Robert Schumann House in Zwickau.

Life 
Synofzik was born in Dortmund. After achieving the Abitur, he studied church music at the Dortmund University of Music. He studied musicology and philosophy at the University of Cologne as well as historical keyboard instruments at the conservatories in Cologne and Brussels. The doctorate followed between 1998 and 2000. In addition to regular concert activities, CD and radio productions, from 1998 to 2005 he worked as a lecturer at universities in Dortmund, Folkwang University of the Arts, Cologne, Detmold and Trossingen and was a freelancer for various radio stations.

Synofzik has been director of the Robert Schumann House in Zwickau since 2015. He is one of the main editors of what is one of the largest edition project dedicated to a composer. The complete correspondence between Robert and Clara Schumann should be available in 50 volumes by 2025.

He has written numerous books, sheet music publications and scientific articles on the life and work of the composer Robert Schumann and his wife Clara., the Schumann-Brahms circle, the music of the early 17th century and the history of interpretation of the 20th century. In his first publications and research contributions, he also devoted himself in many ways to the environment of Johann Sebastian Bach.

Awards 
 2021 Robert Schumann Prize of the City of Zwickau

Books 
 Briefe und Dokumente im Schumannhaus Bonn-Endenich, Bonn 1993
 Heinrich Grimm. Cantilena est loquela canens. Studien zur Überlieferung und Kompositionstechnik. Eisenach 2000
 Heinrich Bach, Kyrie zu sechs Stimmen, Stuttgart 2001
 Rheinische Sängerinnen des 20. Jahrhunderts. Eine Dokumentation in Wort und Ton. (together with Susanne Rode-Breymann), Kassel 2003
 Heinrich Heine – Robert Schumann. Musik und Ironie. 2nd edit., Cologne: Dohr, 2010,

Essays 
 Kantaten von Alessandro Scarlatti im Bücken-Nachlass der Kölner Universitätsbibliothek, in Aspetti musicali. Musikhistorische Dimensionen Italiens 1600 bis 2000. Festschrift für Dietrich Kämper zum 65. Geburtstag, edited by Norbert Bolin, Christoph von Blumröder and Imke Misch, Cologne, Dohr 2001
 Mendelssohn, Schumann und das Problem der Männergesangskomposition. in Schumanniana nova. Festschrift Gerd Nauhaus zum 60. Geburtstag, Sinzig: Studio-Verlag 2002, 
 Die Schumann-Biographie Wilhelm Joseph von Wasielewski (Dresden 1858), in Schumann und Dresden. Bericht über das Symposion "Robert und Clara Schumann in Dresden – biographische, kompositionsgeschichtliche und soziokulturelle Aspekte" in Dresden vom 15. bis 18. Mai 2008, edited by Thomas Synofzik and Hans-Günter Ottenberg (Studien zum Dresdner Musikleben im 19. Jahrhundert, vol. 1), Cologne: Dohr 2010

References

External links 
 
 Thomas Synofzik on 

1966 births
Living people
People from Dortmund
German musicologists